Chirakumar Sabha (English: A Conference of Bachelors) is a 1932 Indian Bengali drama film directed by Premankur Atorthy. The music of the film was composed by R. C. Boral who used Tagore's songs as lyrics. It was one of the first of Rabindranath Tagore's works to be made into a film. The film was remade in 1956  by Debaki Bose.

Plot
The story revolves around a group of hardened bachelors who meet on a regular basis, and eventually settle for marriage. Purna is a newcomer to the group of bachelors at Professor Chandra Basu's house. Also attending are three other bachelors Akshay, Bipin and Shirish. Alshay is ousted from the committee when he gets married. He suggests that all members meet at his place instead. Nirmala, the Professor's daughter also joins the crowd becoming the only female member. Purna is attracted to Nirmala and suggests marriage, which Nirmala refuses. Akshay has three sisters Shailabala a child widow, Nripabala and Nirabala. His mother is busy fixing matches for Nripabala and Nirabala. Finally the two sisters are matched with Shirish and Bipin, while Nirmala and Purna get together.

Cast
Durgadas Bannerjee as Purna
Molina Devi as Nirmala
Amar Mullick as Professor Chandra Basu
Tinkari Chakraborty as Akshay
Phani Burma as Bipin
Indu Mukherjee as Shirish
Suniti as Nirabala
Anupama as Nripabala
Manoranjan Bhattacharya as Rasik
Dhiren Bannerjee as Darukeshwar
Nibhanani Debi as Shailabala
Dhani Dutta

References

External links

1932 films
Bengali-language Indian films
Indian black-and-white films
Films directed by Premankur Atorthy
1930s Bengali-language films
Films based on works by Rabindranath Tagore